Germfask Township is a civil township of Schoolcraft County in the U.S. state of Michigan.  The population was 486 at the 2010 census.

The name was derived from the surname initials of eight of the original settlers of 1881: John Grant, Matthew Edge, William Robinson, Thaddeus Mead, Dr. W. W. French, Ezekiel Ackley, Oscar (O.D.) Sheppard, and Hezekiah Knaggs.  The community was a station on the Manistique Railway and was given a post office on February 26, 1890.

Communities
The Germfask 49836 ZIP Code serves most of the township.

Geography

Demographics
As of the census of 2000, there were 491 people, 198 households, and 142 families residing in the township.  The population density was 7.2 per square mile (2.8/km2).  There were 309 housing units at an average density of 4.6 per square mile (1.8/km2).  The racial makeup of the township was 91.45% White, 0.81% African American, 6.11% Native American, 0.20% Asian, and 1.43% from two or more races.

There were 198 households, out of which 25.3% had children under the age of 18 living with them, 63.6% were married couples living together, 5.6% had a female householder with no husband present, and 27.8% were non-families. 23.2% of all households were made up of individuals, and 10.6% had someone living alone who was 65 years of age or older.  The average household size was 2.44 and the average family size was 2.75.

In the township the population was spread out, with 20.0% under the age of 18, 9.4% from 18 to 24, 23.6% from 25 to 44, 30.1% from 45 to 64, and 16.9% who were 65 years of age or older.  The median age was 43 years. For every 100 females, there were 104.6 males.  For every 100 females age 18 and over, there were 93.6 males.

The median income for a household in the township was $27,625, and the median income for a family was $29,375. Males had a median income of $31,875 versus $16,364 for females. The per capita income for the township was $14,648.  About 9.4% of families and 11.3% of the population were below the poverty line, including 11.9% of those under age 18 and 10.7% of those age 65 or over.

References

Townships in Schoolcraft County, Michigan
Townships in Michigan